Garden of Love is a 2003 German horror film, directed and written by Olaf Ittenbach. in this movie, a murderous spirit haunts the woman who was his daughter in life.

Cast
 Natacza Boon ... Rebecca Verlaine
 James Matthews ... Thomas Munster
 Daryl Jackson ... David Riven
 Bela B. Felsenheimer ... Gabriel Verlaine
 Anika Julien ... Young Rebecca

References

External links
 
 

2003 films
German splatter films
German supernatural horror films
Films directed by Olaf Ittenbach
English-language German films
2000s English-language films
2000s German films